The Minister of South Berwick was the head of the medieval house of non-mendicant Augustinian Trinatarian friars (also known as Red Friars) in the Scottish border town of South Berwick.  The income of the house was allocated equally towards the upkeep of the brethren, the sustenance of the poor and the poor travellers and the recovery of crusader captives.  The house was founded before 1240–8. Each house comprised a minister and five brethren.  The names of all of the ministers are incomplete.

List of ministers
Adam 1296 
Andrew de Scotlandwell (Fontescocie) 1387 – x1414
John de St Andrews (Andirstoun) x1414 – 1428?
John Gutherie (Butheoy) x1446 – 1447 
Edward Gray 1446 – 1447 
William Restoun 1446 
David Craig (Crach) 1456 – 1458
Robert Clegston (Clugston) 1456 – 1474
Thomas Lothian 1466
John Ker 1471

Notes

References

Bibliography
 
 

Christianity in medieval Scotland